A human challenge study, also called a challenge trial or controlled human infection model (CHIM), is a type of clinical trial for a vaccine or other pharmaceutical involving the intentional exposure of the test subject to the condition tested. Human challenge studies may be ethically controversial because they involve exposing test subjects to dangers beyond those posed by potential side effects of the substance being tested.

During the mid 20th and 21st century, the number of human challenge studies has been increasing. A challenge study to test promising vaccines for prevention of COVID-19 was under consideration during 2020 by several vaccine developers, including the World Health Organization (WHO), and was approved in the UK in 2021.

Over the second half of the 20th and the 21st centuries, vaccines for some 15 major pathogens have been fast-tracked in human challenge studies – involving about 30,000 participants – while contributing toward vaccine development to prevent cholera, typhoid, seasonal flu, and other infections. Since the 1980s, challenge trials which reported about adverse events have had only 0.2% of patients with serious adverse events.
According to medical ethicists, methods of conducting clinical trials by human challenge testing have improved over the 21st century to satisfy ethical, safety, and regulatory requirements, becoming scientifically acceptable and ethically valid as long as participants are well-informed and volunteer freely, and the trials adhere to established rigor for conducting clinical research.

Design
The intent of a challenge study is to fast-track the timeline for providing evidence of safety and efficacy of a therapeutic drug or vaccine, especially by compressing (to a few months) the usually lengthy duration of PhaseII–III trials (typically, many years). Following preliminary proof of safety and efficacy of a candidate drug or vaccine in laboratory animals and healthy humans, controlled "challenge" studies may be implemented to bypass typical PhaseIII research, providing an accelerated path to regulatory approval of the test compound for widespread prevention against an infectious disease, such as COVID‑19.

The design of a challenge study involves first, simultaneously testing a vaccine candidate for immunogenicity and safety in laboratory animals and healthy adult volunteers (100 or fewer)which is usually a sequential process using animals firstand second, rapidly advancing its effective dose into a large-scale PhaseII–III trial in low-risk, healthy volunteers (such as young adults), who would then be deliberately infected with the disease being tested against for comparison with a placebo control group. In a challenge study for a vaccine to prevent an infectious disease, participants would be closely monitored for signs of toxicity and adequate immune response, such as by producing substantial levels of antibodies against the virus causing the disease.

Ethics
Awareness of the history of challenge trials is indispensable, including trials that were problematic or even connected to abuse. Special ethical issues can arise when a wealthy country finances and organizes these clinical trials in a less wealthy country.

Two commonly discussed general thresholds for risk to research participant are minimizing all risk after the infection and avoiding serious injury. Researchers typically customize other thresholds for each clinical trial.

Vaccines for infections
Challenge studies have been used to expedite evaluation of vaccines for several diseases, such as cholera, typhoid fever, malaria, influenza, streptococcal pharyngitis, tuberculosis, shigella, pertussis, and dengue fever.

Other than expediting clinical evaluation of vaccine properties, advantages of using challenge studies for vaccine candidates include minimizing bias which is inherently part of traditional cohort studies, as both the exposure (timing of infection, virus challenge dose) and outcome (assessment of blood biomarkers) are standardized. Disadvantages include high cost of conducting the trial at multiple locations and the complex management of infrastructure for a challenge trial, especially for obtaining national regulatory approval, organizing participants and trial personnel, and implementing laboratories with Good Clinical Laboratory Practice qualifications. Before beginning a challenge study, a vaccine sponsor must have demonstrated Good Manufacturing Practice standards for approval to use the candidate vaccine in humans, including expensive toxicology and immunogenicity testing. The vaccine sponsor may have required proof of safety and efficacy of adjuvants for delivering the vaccine, demonstrated what the effective vaccination schedule may be, and coordinated with international regulatory agencies and bioethicists for approval and eventual distribution, all requiring coordinated financing and planning.

COVID-19

Human challenge studies are under consideration to hasten the development of a COVID-19 vaccine, including one proposal made by bioethicist Nir Eyal, and another by rubella vaccine inventor Stanley Plotkin with bioethicist Arthur Caplan. These authors propose that the multi-year duration and multinational location of a typical Phase III efficacy clinical trial will continue as usual, while people infected with COVID-19 will continue to suffer or die. As an alternative based on emerging results from COVID-19 vaccine challenge studies, regulatory agencies could allow early emergency use of the vaccine, while the challenge study continues collecting data for eventual licensure.

In May 2020, a guidance document was issued by the WHO on criteria for conducting challenge clinical trials and providing clinical care for the participants. Following the challenge infection with or without the candidate vaccine, volunteers would be monitored closely in hospitals or clinics managed by physicians treating people with COVID-19 disease and with life-saving resources, if needed. Volunteering for a vaccine challenge study during the COVID‑19 pandemic is likened to the emergency service of healthcare personnel for COVID‑19-infected people, firefighters, or organ donors.

References

External links
 
 Let volunteers take the COVID challenge: Young, healthy, informed people should be allowed to participate in vaccine trials. Conor Friedersdorf, The Atlantic, 21 April 2020
 1 Day Sooner, US-UK advocacy organization for human challenge studies of candidate COVID-19 vaccines (25,104 volunteers from 102 countries, as of late May 2020)

Clinical trials by type
Human subject research